The Purple Line is a light rail transit (LRT) line under construction in the Tel Aviv metropolitan Area in Israel. The line will operate as part of the planned Tel Aviv metropolitan area mass transit system and is expected to be the second line to open. The line will connect the city centre of Tel Aviv with its eastern suburbs of Yehud and Giv'at Shmuel.

Construction started in 2018 and the line is expected to open in 2026 at an estimated cost of NIS 11 billion.

History

In 2007, NTA submitted for government approval a comprehensive plan for a mass transit system in the Tel Aviv metropolitan area, which included light rail and bus rapid transit lines. The plan included an LRT line which was to loop around central Tel Aviv before turning east and branching out to Petah Tikva and Yehud. By 2008, that line was colour-coded purple and the Israeli government allocated NIS 55 million for its planning.

At the eastern end of the line, a northern branch was initially planned to continue from Giv'at Shmuel into Petah Tikva, crossing the city from southwest to northeast and ending at Petah Tikva Segula railway station. However, this proposal was met with opposition from Petah Tikva municipality and residents starting in 2010, and by 2015 the Petah Tikva section of the line was dropped. Another rejected proposal called to extend the southern branch of the line from Tayasim Junction eastwards to the town of Shoham.

In December 2011, the Israeli government selected the Purple Line as one of the lines to be planned by NTA. In August 2016, the government approved the construction and operation of the line, as a public-private partnership (PPP), at a then-estimated cost of NIS 8.6 billion. The western section of the route was approved in January 2017. 

In May 2017 NTA published tenders for project management and detailed planning of the line. Tenders for rolling stock, tracks, electrification, signalling and maintenance were published in July 2018, and by September 2020 five international consortia submitted their bids. Demolitions of buildings on the route in the Kfar Shalem neighbourhood of Tel Aviv began in July 2018, however, in April 2021 it was reported that controversy surrounding the demolition of the remaining buildings forced NTA to postpone the contract awarding.

Construction work on the line commenced in December 2018, and is currently ongoing.

Route
The Purple Line will follow a semi-circular route in central Tel Aviv, between Tel Aviv Central railway station (Arlozorov Terminal) in the north and Tel Aviv HaHagana railway station in the south, looping westwards through the heart of the city. On the way it will pass through Arlozorov, Ben Yehuda, Allenby, Aliya and Levinsky streets. In this section it will interchange with the Red Line and the Green Line of the Tel Aviv Light Rail twice each: with the Red Line, in Arlozorov Terminal in the north and Yehuda HaLevi in the south; and with the Green Line, in Ibn Gabirol in the north and Har Tsiyon in the south.  

From Tel Aviv HaHagana the line will continue eastwards along HaHagana Street and HaShalom Road, skirting Giv'atayim and passing through Ramat Gan by way of Aluf Sadeh and Sheba roads before reaching Sheba Medical Center. Here the line will split into two branches:
 The northern branch will travel northwards through Kiryat Ono and terminate in Bar-Ilan University and Giv'at Shmuel. 
 The southern branch will continue eastwards along Route 461, skirting Or Yehuda and Yehud before reaching the terminus at Tayasim Junction near Bnei Atarot.  

The Purple Line will be the only Tel Aviv LRT line to travel at street level in central Tel Aviv, and the only one to be aboveground in its entirety.

References

External links
 Official page in English
 Allenby Street and Ben Yehuda Street section
 NTA promotional video of the planned route
 NTA promotional video simulating the line 

Transport in Tel Aviv
Proposed railway lines in Israel
2026 in rail transport
Tel Aviv Light Rail